Holly Mills is an English long jumper and heptathlete. She finished fourth both in the pentathlon at the 2022 World Indoor Championships and in the heptathlon at the 2022 Commonwealth Games. Mills won bronze medals for the heptathlon at the 2021 European Under-23 Championships and for the long jump at the 2019 European U20 Championships.

She was the long jump 2016 European U18 and 2017 Commonwealth Youth Games champion. In 2020, she won the British national pentathlon title.

Mills comes from Andover, Hampshire and competes for Andover Athletics Club. She started athletics at the age of eight. At 14, she won several titles at the School and National competitions.

Statistics

Personal bests
 Heptathlon – 6260 pts (Götzis 2022)
 100 metres hurdles – 13.21 (-1.1 m/s, Lana 2021)
 200 metres – 24.13 (+1.7 m/s, Mannheim 2019)
 800 metres – 2:08.07 (Götzis 2022)
 High jump – 1.85 (Arona 2021)
 Long jump – 6.51 (+0.6 m/s, Mannheim 2019)
 Shot put – 13.78 (London 2021)
 Javelin throw – 39.07 (Götzis 2022)
Indoors
 Pentathlon – 4673 pts (Belgrade 2022)
 60 metres hurdles – 8.15 (Belgrade 2022)
 800 metres – 2:09.97 (Belgrade 2022)
 High jump – 1.77 (Istanbul 2023)
 Long jump – 6.37 (Tallinn 2022)
 Shot put – 14.03 (Manchester 2021)

National titles
 British Indoor Athletics Championships
 Pentathlon: 2020

References and notes

External links
 

2000 births
Living people
Sportspeople from Hampshire
English long jumpers
English high jumpers
English female long jumpers
English female high jumpers
Athletes (track and field) at the 2022 Commonwealth Games